St Peter's Church is a parish church in Boughton Monchelsea, Kent. It is a Grade II* listed building.

Building 
The church is mostly built of ragstone.

The lychgate in the churchyard dates from 1470, and is Grade II* listed independently of the church.

History 
St Peter's Church was damaged by fire in 1832.

See also 
 Boughton Monchelsea

References 

Church of England church buildings in Kent
Grade II* listed churches in Kent